Po' Folks (later restyled PoFolks) is an American family restaurant chain founded in 1975 in Anderson, South Carolina. Between 1982 and 1988, Po' Folks was operated by the fast food chain Krystal.

History
Betty K Hare opened the first Po' Folks in 1975 in Anderson, South Carolina.

The restaurant was named after the 1961 hit single by country music singer Bill Anderson. Although Anderson initially planned to file a lawsuit against the chain for using the name, he later sold the rights to the chain and served as its spokesperson. He and Conway Twitty also acquired franchise rights to a location in Oklahoma City in 1983.  Anderson's country-music themed game show on TNN, Fandango, was sponsored by the restaurant.

Krystal acquired Po' Folks in 1982 and continued to expand it. By 1984, the chain had 102 restaurants in 17 states. Eric A. Holm (now with Golden Corral) was director of construction and accused of taking bribes for favorable construction deals. Krystal later merged Po' Folks with DavCo, a division of the company that franchised Wendy's restaurants. In 1988, Po' Folks filed for bankruptcy. As a result, the Po' Folks restaurants were sold, and the remaining assets continued to operate as DavCo. As of November 2022, there are 5 locations remaining in Florida.  Callaway, Lynn Haven, Niceville, Pensacola and St. Petersburg.

References

External links
 
 PoFolks customer reviews on TripAdvisor

Defunct restaurant chains in the United States
Defunct companies based in South Carolina
Restaurants established in 1975
Restaurants disestablished in 1988
1975 establishments in South Carolina
1988 disestablishments in South Carolina